Council of Higher Secondary Education may also refer to:

Indian/State Government Boards of CHSE

Council of Higher Secondary Education, Orissa
West Bengal Council of Higher Secondary Education